Nevin William Hayes, O.Carm. (February 17, 1922 - July 12, 1988) was an American Bishop of the Catholic Church. He served as the prelate of the Territorial Prelature of Sicuani in Peru from 1959 to 1970 and as an auxiliary bishop of the Archdiocese of Chicago from 1971 to 1988.

Biography

Born in Chicago, Illinois, Nevin Hayes professed religious vows in the Order of the Brothers of Our Lady of Mount Carmel (Carmelites).

On June 8, 1946, he was ordained a priest.  Hayes was appointed as the prelate of the Territorial Prelature of Sicuani on January 10, 1959, by Pope John XXIII. While remaining the Prelate of Sicuani, Pope Paul VI appointed him as the Titular Bishop of Nova Sinna.  He was consecrated a bishop by Chicago Auxiliary Bishop Cletus F. O'Donnell. The principal co-consecrators were Bishops Bernard Joseph Flanagan of Worcester and William G. Connare of Greensburg.

Hayes resigned as prelate on November 7, 1970, and was appointed Auxiliary Bishop of Chicago on February 2, 1971. He served in that capacity until his death on July 12, 1988.

In 1994, Leander Troy wrote the book The Dandelion Bishop: Nevin Hayes of Chicago,  which discussed Haye's work with indigenous tribes in Peru.

References

External links

 

1922 births
1988 deaths
Clergy from Chicago
Carmelite bishops
20th-century Roman Catholic bishops in Peru
20th-century American Roman Catholic titular bishops
Catholics from Illinois
Roman Catholic bishops of Sicuani